Royal Air Force Skeabrae or more simply RAF Skeabrae is a former Royal Air Force station located in Orkney, Mainland, United Kingdom.

History
The following units were here at some point:
Squadrons

Units
 Advanced Ship Recognition Flight RAF (January - February 1943) became No. 1476 (Advanced Ship Recognition) Flight RAF (February - June 1943 & June - January 1944)
 No. 1491 (Fighter Gunnery) Flight RAF (November 1942 - August 1943)
 1841 Naval Air Squadron
 No. 2714 Squadron RAF Regiment
 No. 2745 Squadron RAF Regiment
 No. 2766 Squadron RAF Regiment
 No. 2824 Squadron RAF Regiment

Royal Navy

Current use
The site is currently open land.

See also
 List of former Royal Air Force stations

References

Citations

Bibliography

Royal Air Force stations in Scotland
Buildings and structures in Orkney
Royal Air Force stations of World War II in the United Kingdom
Military airbases established in 1940
Mainland, Orkney